The Imperial Household Department was an institution of the Qing dynasty of China. Its primary purpose was to manage the internal affairs of the Qing imperial family and the activities of the inner palace (in which tasks it largely replaced eunuchs), but it also played an important role in Qing relations with Tibet and Mongolia, engaged in trading activities (jade, ginseng, salt, furs, etc.), managed textile factories in the Jiangnan region, and even published books.

This department was also in charge of the ceremonial and spiritual activities of the Qing imperial household. These activities include the maintenance of the mausoleums of Qing emperors, polytheist worships and posthumous affairs of the royal family (the giving of temple names and posthumous names).

Origins
The department was established before the Manchu-led Qing dynasty defeated the Ming dynasty in 1644, but it became mature only after 1661, following the death of the Shunzhi Emperor and the accession of his son, who reigned as the Kangxi Emperor.

In 1654, the department was temporarily substituted by the Thirteen Yamen (十三衙門) which had similar functions. In 1661, the thirteen yamen were abolished with the re-establishment of the imperial household department.

Personnel
The department was manned by booi (Manchu: booi), or "bondservants", who were selected from the bondservants of the upper three banners. Booi was sometimes synonymous with booi aha, which literally means "household person", but aha usually referred to the hereditary and legally servile people who worked in fields, whereas booi usually referred to household servants who performed domestic service. The booi who operated the Imperial Household Department can be divided into roughly four groups:

 a small booi elite; 
 the majority of the booi; 
 indentured servants of the booi; 
 the state bondservants (Manchu: sinjeku).

In total, there were three nirus of the department consist of booi. They are Cigu Niru (Chinese niru), Solho Niru (Korean niru) and Hoise Niru (Muslim niru) respectively. The demographic composition of the department was thus diverse. Manchu, Han Chinese, Korean and Muslim were cooperating to keep the department functioning. The three nirus of the imperial household department were under the inner three banners out of the Eight Banners system.

Various classes of Booi
booi niru a Manchu word ), meaning Neiwufu Upper Three Banner's platoon leader of about 300 men.
booi guanlin a Manchu word ), meaning the manager of booi doing all the domestic duties of Neiwufu.
 booi amban is also a Manchu word, meaning high official ).
 Estate bannerman ) are those renegade Chinese who joined the Jurchen, or original civilians-soldiers working in the fields. These people were all turned into booi aha, or field bondservants.
 sinjeku is another Manchu word ), the lowest class of the bondservants.

Divisions
The central administration of the imperial household department was carried out by its chancery. Under the chancery, there were 7 Si (司), 3 Yuan (院) as well as numerous properties in different regions of China. One Grand chancellor of   senior second rank to senior first rank was set at the top of the department. To assist the work of the Grand  chancellor, there were 37 bithesi (Manchu: bithesi, Secretaries) one langzhong (senior fifth rank) and one  (senior sixth rank).

Below are some of the many bureaus that were supervised by the Chancery of the Imperial Household Department in Beijing:

Seven Si 
The Seven Si are the main functioning body of the department. Every Si (department) has several Langzhong (郎中), Yuanwailang (員外郎) and Bithesi who were officers that supervise the works of these departments.
Privy Purse (later Guangchusi 廣儲司), in charge of imperial revenues and expenditures. At least as early as 1727, Administrator of the Canton Customs, known to Europeans as the "Hoppo", delivered substantial revenues to the Imperial Household Department through the Privy Purse.
Department of Works, in charge of maintaining and repairing buildings inside the palace.
Department of Huntsmen, in charge of personnel appointment and removal as well as the hunting of wild lives.
Department of Ceremonies, in charge of ceremonial affairs.
Department of royal Ranch, in charge of the royal ranch which provides livestock for the royal house.
Department of Accounting, in charge of real estates of the imperial household.
Department of Prudence, in charge of the martial law of the upper three banners which were governed by the emperor himself.

Three Yuan 
Bureau of Imperial Gardens and Parks, in charge of the everyday maintenance of palace gardens.
Imperial Armory, in charge of the manufacture and repair of palace weapons.
Imperial Stables, in charge of maintaining all the palace's horses

Other subsidiaries 
Imperial Buttery, in charge of cooking ordinary meals for the court.
Shenfang, in charge of rituals.
Old Summer Palace, known for being burned down by Anglo-French expedition force in 1860. 
Summer Palace, now a UNESCO World Heritage Site
Chengde Mountain Resort, now a UNESCO World Heritage Site.
Yonghe Temple
Bureau of internal management, in charge of the maintenance of imperial warehouses.
By the nineteenth century, the Imperial Household Department managed the activities of more than 56 subagencies.

References

External links
 A study on Manchu Imperial Household Department in Chinese:清代内务府研究综述 李典蓉
 Chinese:内务府三旗（booi ilan gusa,ilan是三的意思， gusa是旗的意思）是包衣三旗，由原来上三旗的包衣组成

Government of Imperial China
Government of the Qing dynasty
Royal households
Eight Banners